In kinematics, the Hoecken linkage (named for Karl Hoecken) is a four-bar linkage that converts rotational motion to approximate straight-line motion. The Hoecken linkage is a cognate linkage of the Chebyshev linkage and Chebyshev's Lambda Mechanism.

The linkage was first published in 1926.

A generalization of the Hoecken linkage is Wittgenstein's rod.

See also 

Chebyshev linkage and Chebyshev lambda linkage, linkages that produce a very similar locus without the need of a sliding joint.
Straight line mechanism
Four-bar linkage

References

External links 

Straight line mechanisms
Linkages (mechanical)